Norman (Norm) Ralph Augustine (born July 27, 1935) is a U.S. aerospace businessman who served as United States Under Secretary of the Army from 1975 to 1977. Augustine served as chairman and CEO of the Lockheed Martin Corporation. He was chairman of the Review of United States Human Space Flight Plans Committee.

In 1983, Augustine was elected as a member into the National Academy of Engineering for imaginative blending of the skills of engineer, analyst, and manager to accomplish important aerospace engineering projects.

Career
Augustine was raised in Colorado and attended Princeton University, from where he graduated magna cum laude with a B.S.E. in Aeronautical Engineering and an M.S.E. He completed a 295-page senior thesis titled "Preliminary Design for a Supersonic Trainer" with John W. Bittig and Douglas N. Beatty. He was elected to Phi Beta Kappa, Tau Beta Pi and Sigma Xi.

In 1958 he joined the Douglas Aircraft Company in California, where he worked as a research engineer, program manager and chief engineer.  Beginning in 1965, he served in the Office of the Secretary of Defense as Assistant Director of Defense Research and Engineering.  He joined LTV Missiles and Space Company in 1970, serving as vice president of advanced programs and marketing.  In 1973 he returned to the government as Assistant Secretary of the Army and in 1975 became Under Secretary of the Army, and later Acting Secretary of the Army.  Joining Martin Marietta Corporation in 1977 as vice president of technical operations, he was elected as CEO in 1987 and chairman in 1988, having previously been president and COO.  In 1990, he chaired the Advisory Committee on the Future of the U.S. Space Program, known as the Augustine Committee.  He served as president of the Lockheed Martin Corporation upon the formation of that company in 1995, and became CEO later that year.  He retired as chairman and CEO of Lockheed Martin in August 1997, when he became a lecturer with the rank of professor on the faculty of Princeton University where he served until July 1999.

In 1999 he helped found In-Q-Tel, a venture capital firm sponsored by the CIA with a mandate to support United States intelligence by investing in advanced technology.

Augustine was chairman and principal officer of the American Red Cross for nine years, chairman of the National Academy of Engineering, president and chairman of the Association of the United States Army, chairman of the Aerospace Industries Association, and chairman of the Defense Science Board.  He is a former president of the American Institute of Aeronautics and Astronautics and the Boy Scouts of America. He is a former member of the board of directors of ConocoPhillips, Black & Decker, Procter & Gamble and Lockheed Martin, and was a member of the board of trustees of Colonial Williamsburg.  He is a regent of the University System of Maryland, trustee emeritus of Johns Hopkins and a former member of the board of trustees of Princeton and MIT.  He is a member of the advisory board to the Department of Homeland Security, was a member of the Hart/Rudman Commission on National Security, and served for 16 years on the President's Council of Advisors on Science and Technology.  He is a member of the guiding coalition of the Project on National Security Reform. He is a member of the American Philosophical Society, the National Academy of Arts and Sciences, and the Explorers Club.

In May 2009 Augustine was named as chairman of the Review of United States Human Space Flight Plans Committee, that was tasked to review NASA's plans for the Moon, Mars and beyond.

In March 2011 Augustine agreed to serve as chair of the U.S. Antarctic Program Blue Ribbon Panel to assess U.S. activities in the South Pole.  In July 2011, Augustine became a member of the United States Energy Security Council, which seeks to diminish oil's monopoly over the US transportation sector and is sponsored by the Institute for the Analysis of Global Security (IAGS). He currently sits on the America Abroad Media advisory board, the advisory board of Feynman School, a school for academically gifted children in STEM fields,  and on the board of advisors of the Code of Support Foundation, a nonprofit military services organization.

Augustine has been presented the National Medal of Technology by the President of the United States and received the Joint Chiefs of Staff Distinguished Public Service Award.  He has five times received the Department of Defense's highest civilian decoration, the Distinguished Civilian Service Award.  He is co-author of The Defense Revolution and Shakespeare In Charge and author of Augustine's Laws and Augustine's Travels.  He holds 34 honorary degrees and was selected by Who's Who in America and the Library of Congress as one of “Fifty Great Americans” on the occasion of Who's Who's fiftieth anniversary.  He has traveled in over 130 countries and stood on both the North and South Poles of the earth.

Awards

 Eagle Scout, 1952
 Member of the National Academy of Engineering, 1983
 National Space Club Goddard Award, 1991
 Fellow of the American Academy of Arts and Sciences, 1992
 Rotary National Award for Space Achievement National Space Trophy, 1992
Silver Buffalo Award, 1994
 Electronic Industries Association Medal of Honor, 1994
Golden Plate Award of the American Academy of Achievement, 1995
 The Washingtonian's Business Leader of the Year, 1997
 National Medal of Technology and Innovation, 1997 "For visionary leadership of the aerospace industry, for championing technical and managerial solutions to the many challenges in civil and defense systems, and for contributions to the United States world preeminence in aerospace."
 The NASA Distinguished Public Service Medal, 1997
 IEEE-HKN Eta Kappa Nu Eminent Member, 2001
 Space Foundation's General James E. Hill Lifetime Space Achievement Award in 2002. The highest honor bestowed by the Space Foundation, the award recognizes outstanding individuals who have distinguished themselves through lifetime contributions to the welfare of betterment of humankind through the exploration, development and use of space, or the use of space technology, information, themes or resources in academic, cultural, industrial or other pursuits of broad benefit to humanity. Augustine was the first recipient.
 Public Welfare Medal from the National Academy of Sciences, 2006
 USO's Freedom's Finest Award, 2004
 The Harold W. McGraw Hill, Jr. Prize in Education, 2006
 The 2006 BENS Eisenhower Award [Business Executives for National Security]
 The 2007 Bower Award for Business Leadership, from The Franklin Institute
 NAA Wright Brothers Memorial Trophy, 2008
 National Science Board Vannevar Bush Award, 2008
 IRI Medal from the Industrial Research Institute, 2009
 The American Chemical Society Public Service Award, 2009
 B. Kenneth West Lifetime Achievement Award, 2009
 NAS Award in Aeronautical Engineering from the National Academy of Sciences, 2010
 Drexel University Engineering Leader of the year, 2011
 The Wings Club Distinguished Achievement Award, 2011
 Character Education Partnership's American Patriot of Character Award, 2012
 Montgomery County Business Hall of Fame, 2012
 Industry Week Manufacturing Hall of Fame, 2012
 Smithsonian Air & Space Museum, Lifetime Achievement Trophy Award, 2014 
 Arthur C. Clarke Lifetime Achievement Award, 2014
 American Astronautical Society Space Flight Award, 2014 
 Advisory Board, Journal of Science Policy & Governance, 2015
 Tech Council of Maryland Lifetime Achievement Award, 2015
 International Von Karman Wings Award, 2015 (For his visionary leadership, contributions to the aerospace industry and distinguished service to the nation's defense, security and space programs)

Notes

References

Review of U.S. Human Space Flight Plans Committee website

External links

American aerospace businesspeople
American chairpersons of corporations
American technology chief executives
1935 births
Living people
Fellows of the American Academy of Arts and Sciences
National Medal of Technology recipients
Members of the United States National Academy of Engineering
Lockheed Martin people
Procter & Gamble people
United States Secretaries of the Army
Businesspeople from Colorado
People from Denver
Princeton University School of Engineering and Applied Science alumni
Ford administration personnel
United States Under Secretaries of the Army
ASME Medal recipients
Presidents of the Boy Scouts of America
Members of the American Philosophical Society
Martin Marietta people